Jeff Avery (born March 28, 1953) is a former professional Canadian football wide receiver for the Ottawa Rough Riders of the Canadian Football League. He was drafted as a territorial exemption in the 1976 CFL Draft by the Rough Riders and would win the Grey Cup with the team that same year. Avery played seven seasons for the Rough Riders, being named a CFL East All-Star in 1977 and 1978. He played CIAU football for the Ottawa Gee-Gees where he won the 1975 Vanier Cup. He was inducted into the Canadian Football Hall of Fame in 2017 as a reporter.

References 

1953 births
Living people
Ottawa Gee-Gees football players
Ottawa Rough Riders players
Canadian football wide receivers
Canadian Football Hall of Fame inductees